The Kingdom of Abkhazia, also known as Abasgia or Egrisi-Abkhazia, was a medieval feudal state in the Caucasus which was established in the 780s. Through dynastic succession, it was united in 1008 with the Kingdom of the Iberians, forming the Kingdom of Georgia.

Byzantine sources record that in the early years of the 10th century Abkhazia stretched three hundred Greek miles along the Black Sea coast, from the frontiers of the thema of Chaldia to the mouth of the river Nicopsis, with the Caucasus behind it.

History

Background 

Abkhazia, or Abasgia of classic sources, was a princedom under Byzantine authority. It lay chiefly along the Black Sea coast in what is now the northwestern part of the modern-day Georgia (disputed Republic of Abkhazia) and extended northward into the territory of today's Krasnodar Krai of Russia. It had Anacopia as its capital. Abkhazia was ruled by a hereditary archon who effectively functioned as a Byzantine viceroy. The country was chiefly Christian and the city of Pityus was a seat of an archbishop directly subordinated to the Patriarch of Constantinople. Another Abasgian episcopal see was that of Soterioupolis.

In 735, a large expedition led by Arab general Marwan was launched against the Georgian kingdoms. The Arabs, pursuing the retreating Georgian princes – brothers Mirian and Archil – surged into Abkhazia in 736. Dysentery and floods, combined with a stubborn resistance offered by the archon Leon I and his Iberian and Lazic allies, made the invaders retreat. Leon I then married Mirian's daughter, and a successor, Leon II exploited this dynastic union to acquire Lazica in the 770s. Presumably considered as a successor state of Lazica (Egrisi, in Georgian sources), this new polity continued to be referred to as Egrisi (Lazica) in some contemporary Georgian (e.g., The Vitae of the Georgian Kings by Leonti Mroveli) and Armenian (e.g., The History of Armenia by Hovannes Draskhanakertsi) chronicles.

Establishment and consolidation 
The successful defense against the Arabs, and new territorial gains, gave the Abkhazian princes enough power to claim more autonomy from the Byzantine Empire. Towards circa 778, Leon II won his full independence with the help of the Khazars; he assumed the title of "King of the Abkhazians" and transferred his capital to the western Georgian city of Kutaisi. According to Georgian annals, Leon subdivided his kingdom into eight duchies: Abkhazia proper, Tskhumi, Bedia, Guria, Racha and Takveri, Svaneti, Argveti, and Kutatisi. During his reign Abkhazian kingdom was at the stage of the state building and was less active in the matter of spreading the borders of the kingdom to the East. After obtaining of the state independence, the matter of the church independence became the main problem. In the early 9th century Abkhazian Church broke away from Constantinople and recognized the authority of the Catholicate of Mtskheta; language of the church in Abkhazia shifted from Greek to Georgian, as Byzantine power decreased and doctrinal differences disappeared.

The most prosperous period of the Abkhazian kingdom was between 850 and 950. Beginning with George I (864 – 871), the increasingly expansionist tendencies of the kingdom led to the enlargement of its realm to the east. The Abkhazian kings controlled duchy of Kartli (central and part of eastern Georgia), and interfered in the affairs of the Armenian and Georgian Bagratids. In about 908 King Constantine III (894 – 923) had finally annexed a significant portion of Kartli, bringing his borders close to the Arab-controlled Tbilisi. For a brief period of time, Kakheti and Hereti in eastern Georgia also recognized the Abkhazian suzerainty. Constantine III also tried to extend his influence over Alania by supporting their Christianization. Under his son, George II (923 – 957), the Abkhazian Kingdom reached a climax of power and prestige. George was also known as a promoter of Orthodox Christianity and a patron of Georgian Christian culture. He helped to establish Christianity as an official religion in Alania, winning the thanks of Constantinople. The contemporary Georgian annals knew him as a "builder of churches". George's successors, however, were unable to retain the kingdom's strength and integrity. During the reign of Leon III (960–969), Kakheti and Hereti emancipated themselves from the Abkhazian rule. A bitter civil war and feudal revolts which began under Demetrius III (969–976) led the kingdom into complete anarchy under the unfortunate Theodosius III the Blind (975 – 978), a weak and inauspicious king.

Unification 

By that time the hegemony in the South Caucasus had finally passed to the Georgian Bagratids of Tao-Klarjeti. In 978, the Bagratid prince Bagrat, nephew (sister's son) of the heirless Theodosius, occupied the Abkhazian throne with the help of his adoptive father David III of Tao. Bagrat's descent from both Bagratid and Abkhazian dynasties made him an acceptable choice for the nobles of the realm who were growing weary of internecine quarrels. In 1008, Bagrat succeeded on the death of his natural father Gurgen as the "King of the Iberians". Thus, these two kingdoms unified through dynastic succession, in practice laying the foundation for the unified Georgian monarchy, officially styled then as the Kingdom of Georgia.

Rulers 
Most Abkhazian kings, with the exception of John and Adarnase of the Shavliani (presumably of Svan origin), came from the dynasty which is sometimes known in modern history writing as the Leonids after the first king Leon, or Anosids, after the prince Anos from whom the royal family claimed their origin. Prince Cyril Toumanoff relates the name of Anos to the later Abkhaz noble family of Anchabadze. By convention, the regnal numbers of the Abkhazian kings continue from those of the archons of Abasgia. There is also some lack of consistency about the dates of their reigns. The chronology below is given as per Toumanoff.

Historiographical conundrum 
Writing the kingdom's primary history was dominated by Georgian and Byzantine sources supported by modern epigraphic and archaeological records.

The problem of the Abkhazian Kingdom, particularly the questions of the nature of its ruling family and its ethnic composition, is a major point of controversy between modern Georgian and Abkhaz scholars. This can be largely explained by the scarcity of primary sources on these issues. Many Georgian historians as well as other historians agree, that the formation of kingdom of Abkhazia was due to the unification of tribes such as Misimians(Proto-Kartvelian Svan tribe) Sanigs(Proto-Kartvelian Zan/Svan tribe), Apsilaes and Abasgoi. In the VII-VIII centuries, during the period of the weakening of Kingdom of Egrisi, the principality of Abazgia was strengthened, which united the already mentioned tribes. Georgian sources call the unification of these tribes Abkhazians, therefore term Abkhazian wasn't used as description of one specific nation but the unification of Kartvelian and Northwest Caucasian tribes. This is objected to on the side of the Abkhazian historians, Most Abkhaz historians claim the kingdom was formed as a result of the consolidation of the early Abkhaz tribes that enabled them to extend their dominance over the neighboring areas.

Most international scholars agree that it is extremely difficult to judge the ethnic identity of the various population segments due primarily to the fact that the terms "Abkhazia" and "Abkhazians" were used in a broad sense during this period—and for some while later—and covered, for all practical purposes, all the population of the kingdom, comprising both the Georgian (including also Mingrelians, Laz, and Svans with their distinct languages that are related to the Georgian language) and possible modern Abkhaz (Abasgoi, Apsilae, and Zygii) peoples. It seems likely that a significant (if not predominant) proportion of the Georgian-speaking population, combined with a drive of the Abkhazian kings to throw off the Byzantine political and cultural dominance, resulted in Georgian replacing Greek as the language of literacy and culture.

Legacy

See also 
History of Georgia (country)

Notes

References

Sources and further reading 
 Alexei Zverev, Ethnic Conflicts in the Caucasus 1988-1994, in B. Coppieters (ed.), Contested Borders in the Caucasus, Brussels: VUBPress, 1996
 Graham Smith, Edward A Allworth, Vivien A Law, Annette Bohr, Andrew Wilson, Nation-Building in the Post-Soviet Borderlands: The Politics of National Identities, Cambridge University Press (September 10, 1998), 
Encyclopaedia of Islam
 Center for Citizen Peacebuilding, Aspects of the Georgian-Abkhazian Conflict
 Вахушти Багратиони. История царства грузинского. Жизнь Эгриси, Абхазети или Имерети. Ч.1
S. H. Rapp, Studies In Medieval Georgian Historiography: Early Texts And Eurasian Contexts, Peeters Bvba (September 25, 2003) 
 Conflicting Narratives in Abkhazia and Georgia. Different Visions of the Same History and the Quest for Objectivity, an article by Levan Gigineishvili, 2003
 The Role of Historiography in the Abkhazo-Georgian Conflict , an article by Seiichi Kitagawa, 1996

Georgiy I Mirsky, G I Mirskii, On Ruins of Empire: Ethnicity and Nationalism in the Former Soviet Union (Contributions in Political Science), Greenwood Press (January 30, 1997) 
Ronald Grigor Suny, The Making of the Georgian Nation: 2nd edition (December 1994), Indiana University Press, page 45
Robert W. Thomson (translator), Rewriting Caucasian History: The Medieval Armenian Adaptation of the Georgian Chronicles: The Original Georgian Texts and Armenian Adaptation (Oxford Oriental Monographs), Oxford University Press, USA (June 27, 1996), 
Toumanoff C., Chronology of the Kings of Abasgia and other Problems // Le Muséon, 69 (1956), S. 73-90.

 
Abkhazia
778 establishments
1008 disestablishments in Asia
States and territories established in the 8th century
Former monarchies of Europe
Former monarchies of Asia
Medieval Georgia (country)
Former monarchies of Western Asia